Dato' Fadlan Hazim bin Anuwar (born 2 January 1992) is a Malaysian actor, singer, and model.

Filmography

Film

Television series

Television movie

Web series

Awards and nominations

References

External links
 
 

1992 births
Living people
Malaysian Muslims
Malaysian people of Malay descent
People from Kuala Lumpur
21st-century Malaysian male actors
Malaysian male actors
Malaysian male film actors
Malaysian male television actors
Malaysian television presenters
Malaysian male models